Palo Seco is a barrio in the municipality of Toa Baja, Puerto Rico. Its population in 2010 was 288.

Palo Seco power plant
One of the main power plants supplying power to Puerto Rico is the  fuel oil power plant located near Palo Seco, Toa Baja. Before Hurricane Irma and Hurricane Maria struck Puerto Rico in September 2017, the Palo Seco plant was slated to close.

Gallery

See also

 List of communities in Puerto Rico
 List of barrios and sectors of Toa Baja, Puerto Rico

References

Barrios of Toa Baja, Puerto Rico